Ochrodion is a genus of beetles in the family Cerambycidae, containing the following species:

 Ochrodion gahani (Gounelle, 1909)
 Ochrodion quadrimaculatum (Gahan, 1892)
 Ochrodion sexmaculatum (Buquet in Guérin-Méneville, 1844)
 Ochrodion tavakiliani Martins & Monne, 2005
 Ochrodion testaceum (Gahan, 1892)

References

Cerambycini